Peter Horsley Phelps (5 February 1909 – 5 October 1986) was an English first-class cricketer who played three matches for Worcestershire in the early 1930s.

He batted at six in each of his four innings, but was not a success: scores of 3, 7, 11 and 4 were hardly what the county was looking for. He was never called upon to bowl his medium pace at first-class level, but he did take a single catch, to dismiss Leicestershire's Harold Riley.

Phelps was born in Malvern, Worcestershire; he died aged 77 in Earlswood, Redhill, Surrey.

External links
 

1909 births
1986 deaths
People from Malvern, Worcestershire
English cricketers
Worcestershire cricketers
Sportspeople from Worcestershire